The Tarrant Tabor was a British triplane bomber designed towards the end of the First World War and was briefly the world's largest aircraft. It crashed, with fatalities, on its first flight.

Development
The Tabor was the first and only aircraft design produced by W.G Tarrant Ltd, a well-known property developer and building contractor at Byfleet, Surrey, which had been subcontracted to build aircraft components during the First World War. In late 1917 Tarrant assembled a design team, led by Walter Barling, hired from the Royal Aircraft Factory and Marcel Lobelle, hired from Martinsyde to design a very large long-range heavy bomber, capable of bombing Berlin.  Captain Percy Townley Rawlings  formerly of the RNAS was general manager of the department.

Construction was primarily in wood with conventional tri-plane strut-braced wings and a monocoque fuselage built up from ply veneers. Circular Warren girders formed of wood joined with longerons formed the fuselage structure. Most of the wood construction was carried out at Byfleet.

The Tabor was originally planned as a biplane powered by four 600 hp Siddeley Tiger engines. However delays in development of the engines meant these would be unavailable and so the aircraft was redesigned to use six 450 hp Napier Lion engines to give a similar power/weight ratio, and a third, upper wing added.

The final design had a wingspan of over 131 ft (40 m), with the central wing of much greater span than the other two. Four engines were mounted in push pull configuration pairs between the lower and middle wings with the other two mounted in tractor configuration between the middle and upper wings, directly above the lower pairs. The tractor engines used two-bladed propellers, the pushers four-bladed ones. Ailerons were fitted only on the middle wing, which Flight magazine commented on as possibly affecting their efficiency. 

With the end of the war conversion to a passenger aircraft was planned.

The monocoque construction gave a large open space within the fuselage described as the length of a cricket pitch in Flight magazine. The pilots were situated in the nose, with a partition separating them from the engineer's station and the engine controls mounted on either side of the opening in the partition. The fuel tanks were in the top and sides of the fuselage to maintain the clear internal space.

The aircraft was built at Farnborough in a large balloon shed. Work on the aircraft had stopped at the end of the First World War, when it was no longer needed as a bomber. It was later completed with the design altered to allow it to be used as a commercial or transport aircraft.

The Admiralty Air Department was asked to check its structural strength. AAD mathematician Letitia Chitty was given this task. In her own words  "Mr. Tarrant was an inspired timber merchant who dreamed of a super-Camel. It hadn't a chance. It was too big, too heavy - that wasn't its fault, but Grade A spruce had by now run out and it had to be built of American white wood (tulip wood). In my language 3,500 instead of 5,500 lb/sq in.". Tragically, her mathematical analysis was not heeded. 

The Tabor's maiden flight was from the Royal Aircraft Establishment at Farnborough on 26 May 1919. Wheeled out at daybreak the Tabor, with two pilots (Captain Frederick Dunn  with Rawlings as his assistant pilot) and five others (Captain Wilson of the Air Ministry, Lt Adams in charge of engines, superintendent of the department at the RAE Mr Grosert, and two mechanics) was taxied around the landing field in a "mile-wide circle" using only the four lower engines. Satisfied with the behaviour of the aircraft the crew decided to take-off. The tail was off the ground but it was still running on the main wheels, intermittently lifting off. When the top two engines were started the aircraft pitched forward, burying the nose into the ground and injuring all on board with the pilots severely injured. Fortunately there was no fire as someone, presumed to be one of the pilots, turned off the engines. Rawlings died after reaching hospital and Dunn died of his injuries two days later.

Later analysis suggested that the upper engines were so far above the fuselage that they forced the nose down when driven up to full power.

Operators

Royal Aircraft Establishment

Specifications (estimated)

See also 
 Witteman-Lewis XNBL-1 - a design by Barling for a similar aircraft for the US Army

Notes

Citations

Bibliography

External links 
 http://members.aol.com/wwatrans/unique.htm
 http://www.uh.edu/engines/epi2099.htm

1910s British bomber aircraft
Triplanes
Cancelled military aircraft projects of the United Kingdom
Tabor
Six-engined push-pull aircraft
Aircraft first flown in 1919
Aviation accidents and incidents in 1919
Aviation accidents and incidents in England